Christiaan Pförtner (born 3 March 1966 in West Berlin) is a retired German footballer who played for SpVgg Bayreuth, SC Fortuna Köln, 1. FC Saarbrücken, FC 08 Homburg and Hannover 96.

References

External links 
 

1966 births
Living people
Footballers from Berlin
German footballers
Germany under-21 international footballers
Association football midfielders
2. Bundesliga players
FC Bayern Munich II players
FC Bayern Munich footballers
SC Fortuna Köln players
1. FC Saarbrücken players
FC 08 Homburg players
Hannover 96 players
TSV Havelse players